Ectomis teutas is a Neotropical species of butterfly in the family Hesperiidae (Eudaminae).

References

Hesperiidae